Vitaliy Serhiyovych Hubarenko (13 June 1934 - 5 April 2000) was a Ukrainian composer.

Life and works
Born in Kharkiv, he graduated from the Kharkiv Conservatory in 1960, where he had studied under Dmitri Klebanov. He was awarded the Ostrovsky Prize in 1967, and the Taras Shevchenko Prize in 1984. His first opera, Zahybel’ eskadry (‘The Destruction of the Squadron’) (1966) brought him to public attention.

His compositions include operas (of which he wrote many including in 1980 the opera-ballet Viy, Reborn May (1974), The Reluctant Matchmaker (1985), and Remember, My Brotherhood, described as an opera-oratorio (1990–91)), film music, and Pys’ma lyubvi (Letters to love) (1972), a cycle of four monologues for soprano and chamber ensemble.

Hubarenko died in Kyiv at age 65.

Sources
 Grove Music Online (subscription access).
 Batovska, O.M., Dramaturgy of choral scenes in the operas of Hubarenko, (dissertation at Odessa Music Academy, 2005) (in Ukrainian)
 International Who's Who in Music and Musicians' Directory, (London, 2000), Hubarenko, Vitaly

Notes

External links
 

1934 births
2000 deaths
20th-century classical composers
20th-century male musicians
Ukrainian classical composers
Ukrainian opera composers
Burials at Baikove Cemetery
Male classical composers
Musicians from Kharkiv